Manḍa is a Dravidian language of Odisha, spoken in the highlands of Thuamul Rampur block of Kalahandi district. It only became known to Western academia in 1964. Its speakers are generally known as 'Khond Parjas' by outsiders but self-identify as Manda Khonds. In the late 1970s and early 1980s, the language was spoken in around 60 villages and the total number of speakers was estimated to be at 4000-5000. However the language is facing endangerment from Odia, which all speakers are bilingual in.

References

External links
Manda basic lexicon at the Global Lexicostatistical Database

Dravidian languages
Endangered languages of India
Languages attested from the 1960s
Languages of Odisha